Matthew "Jimmy" Dalton (died 2016) was an English professional rugby league footballer.

Career
Dalton was capped for Great Britain against France in 1986. His career ended due to Castleman’s syndrome . Later, he was diagnosed with Pyrin Associated Febrile Syndrome. Besides working at Starting Point, he was also working the switchboard and security at West Cumberland Hospital.

Dalton started his rugby league career at Amateur side Hensingham ARLFC with his brothers he signing for Whitehaven R.L.F.C. soon after.

Death
Dalton was found dead in Crow Park, Whitehaven on 8 November 2016, after people had been searching for him for two days. In a suicide note to his family, Dalton referenced the toll of both physical and mental health issues as well as having broken up with his on-and-off partner of ten years, Gail Lamb. At the time of his death, he was 53 years old.

Dalton was the father of two children and had four grandchildren. He was considered influential in setting up Starting Point in Whitehaven. He helped people there in the road to recovery from drug and alcohol problems.

References

1963 births
2016 deaths
2016 suicides
English rugby league players
Great Britain national rugby league team players
Rugby league wingers
Rugby league players from Whitehaven
Whitehaven R.L.F.C. players
Suicides in England